The 2007 Møbelringen Cup was held in Sandefjord, Skien and Drammen, Norway. The tournament started on 23 November 2007 and finished on 25 November. Norway won the event on goal difference ahead of Russia and Denmark.

Results

23 November 2007, Sandefjord

24 November 2007, Skien

25 November 2007, Drammen

References
Official Site

Moebelringen Cup
2007
2007 in Norwegian sport